Jurong Country Garden School (JCGS) is a private international school that opened on September 1, 2013, operated by Bright Scholar Education Group, and was established by the chair of the board of Country Garden - Mr. Yang Guoqiang. JCGS currently has 1300 students. 

The school offers a 15-year International Baccalaureate education for all three programmes (PYP, MYP and DP). The school is located in Country Garden Phoenix Community in the Jurong Economic Development Zone, which is part of the Yangtze River Delta and close to developed cities such as Shanghai, Hangzhou, and Nanjing.

The school covers an area of approximately 134,000 m2, including a construction area of 160,000 m2, and has a maximum capacity of 24 kindergarten classes, 50 PYP classes, 50 MYP classes, and 20 DP classes, with a total enrollment of 3,600 students. JCGS offers a high-level education as well as three swimming pools, a sports field, a gymnasium, a library, a theater, a lecture hall, a variety of laboratories, and specialist classrooms. All classrooms have interactive whiteboards, televisions, computers, digital radios, and other technological learning aids.

References 

2013 establishments in China
International schools in China